Calixte Dakpogan (born 1958) is a Beninese sculptor known for his installations as well as his masks made out of diverse and original found materials.  A native of Pahou, he currently lives and works in Porto Novo.  Much of his work is inspired by his Voudon heritage.

Dakpogan's work was exhibited at the "Ouidah '92" festival, which celebrated Vodun art from Benin and the African Diaspora in Ouidah, Benin in February 1993.
Many of his masks are part of The Contemporary African Art Collection (CAAC) of Jean Pigozzi and are exhibited in major group shows in museums around the world.

Group exhibitions
2000: Rendering Visible : Contemporary Art from the Republic of Benin, October Gallery, London, UK
2000: Partage d’Exotismes, 5th Biennale de Lyon, France
2000: Fait Maison, Musée international des arts modestes, Sète, France
2005: African Art Now : Masterpieces from the Jean Pigozzi Collection, Museum of Fine Arts, Houston, USA
2005: Arts of Africa, Grimaldi Forum, Monaco, France
2006/2007: 100% Africa, Guggenheim Museum Bilbao, Spain
2007: Masques rituels et contemporains, Fondation Jean Paul Blachère, Apt, France
2007/2008: Why Africa?, Pinacoteca Giovanni e Marella Agnelli, Turin, Italy
2010: African Stories, Marrakech Art Fair, Marrakech

Bibliography
1994: Otro pais: escalas africanas,  Exhibition catalogue.
1992: Dakar Biennale (1). Dak’Art 92, Exhibition catalogue
1995: Africus : Johannesburg Biennale, 1995 Exhibition catalogue.
1996: Contemporary Art of Africa, André Magnin and Jacques Soulillou
1997: Lumière Noire : Art Contemporain, Exhibition catalogue. 
1998: Bénin-Bénin, Gisteren-Tussen-Morgen. Exhibition catalogue. Fritz Bless et al.
2000: Forjar el Espacio : La Escultura Forjada en el siglo XX, Exhibition catalogue.
2000: Lyon Biennale d’Art Contemporain, (5) Partage d’Exotismes, Exhibition catalogue.
2001: Rendering Visible : Contemporary Art from the Republic of Benin, Exhibition catalogue. Published by The October Gallery.
2005:  African Art Now: Masterpieces from the Jean Pigozzi Collection,  Exhibition catalogue. Published by Merrell. 
2006: 100% Africa, Exhibition catalogue. Published by TF Editores & FMGB Guggenheim Bilbao Museum.
2007: Why Africa?, Exhibition catalogue. Published by Electa & Pinacoteca Giovanni e Marella Agnelli.

References

Biography from the National Museum of African Art

1958 births
Living people
20th-century Beninese sculptors
Male sculptors
Voodoo artists
21st-century sculptors
20th-century male artists
21st-century male artists
People from Atlantique Department
People from Porto-Novo
Installation artists